Petersham Girls High School was a girls high school in the suburb of Petersham, Sydney, Australia. It closed in 1989.

History 
The school was located at 35 West Street, Petersham and is now the NSW School of Languages. It opened in 1878, and was merged with Newtown Boys High School to form the Newtown High School of the Performing Arts in 1990.

Notable alumni
 Sandra Nori, NSW politician and government minister

See also 
 List of defunct government high schools in Sydney
 List of government schools in New South Wales

References

Further reading
CRASH OF A MOSQUITO OVER SUBURBS OF SYDNEY, NSW ON 2 MAY 1945

Defunct public high schools in Sydney
1878 establishments in Australia
Educational institutions established in 1878
Defunct girls' schools in Australia
1980 disestablishments in Australia
Educational institutions disestablished in 1980
Petersham, New South Wales